Georges-Étienne Bonnet (22/23 July 1889 – 18 June 1973) was a French politician who served as foreign minister in 1938 and 1939 and was a leading figure in the Radical Party.

Early life 
Bonnet was born in Bassillac, Dordogne, the son of a lawyer. Bonnet's father worked at the Cour de cassation (Court of Appeal) and used his wealth to give his son the best education money could buy in France. Bonnet was educated the elite Lycée Henri IV, the École supérieue des hautes études, and the  École des sciences politiques. Bonnet studied law and political science at the École Libre des Sciences Politiques and Sorbonne.

Economic expert 
Bonnet began his career as an auditeur at the Conseil d'état. In 1911, he launched his political career after marrying Odette Pelletan, the granddaughter of Eugene Pelletan. Bonnet's wife, often known as Madame Soutien-Georges, ran a salon, and had great ambitions for her husband; one contemporary reported that Madame Bonnet was "so wildly ambitious for her husband that when a new ministry was being formed he was afraid to go home at night unless he had captured a post for himself." Many privately mocked Bonnet for the way in which his wife dominated him. The moniker "Madame Soutien-Georges" directed towards Bonnet's wife was a French pun on the word for brassiere (soutien-gorge) and was both a reference to Madame Bonnet and to the size of her breasts.

In 1914, Bonnet joined the French Army. During his service in World War I, Bonnet was a much-decorated soldier who won the Croix de guerre medal for bravery under fire. in 1918 served as director of demobilization. Bonnet served as the editor on Alfred de Tarde's book L'Ame du soldat (The Soul of a Soldier). Bonnet highlighted the passage by de Trade where he wrote: "The France of 1914-1917 is more sincerely democratic than it has ever been, and she is in love with command". As an upper-class man, Bonnet was in some awe of the camaraderie and fighting spirit of the mostly lower-class poilus, and saw it as his duty to record their experiences. Bonnet seemed to have been jealous of the toughness of the ordinary French soldiers who lived under conditions that he could never accept. Bonnet often recounted the story of a poilu named Lauteau, a happily married man with two children, who was killed while displaying a reckless disregard for his own life while repairing a telephone wire severed by German artillery. Bonnet used the story of Lauteau as an example of the Union sacree in action as he argued in his 1919 book  Lettres á un Bourgeois de 1914 that it was love of la patrie that inspired the poilus to resist.  In 1919, Bonnet served as a secretary to the French delegation at the Paris Peace Conference of 1919 and wrote a book, Lettres á un Bourgeois de 1914, that called for widespread social reforms. The British historian Anthony Adamthwaite noted that Lettres á un Bourgeois de 1914 was the last serious interest that Bonnet was to display in social reform.

Bonnet served in the Chamber of Deputies from 1924 to 1928 and again from 1929 to 1940. He was appointed undersecretary of state in 1925, the first in a series of high ministerial positions throughout the 1920s and 1930s. During his time as in the Chamber, Bonnet was regarded as a leading expert in financial and economic matters. As a minister, Bonnet had a reputation for hard work, always being well prepared in parliamentary debates and excelling at political intrigue. In 1931, in response to an appeal for help from China, the League of Nations sent a group of educational experts to suggest improvements to the Chinese educational system. The experts were Carl Heinrich Becker, the former education minister of Prussia; the Christian Socialist British historian R. H. Tawney who was the only member of the group who had been to China before and who could speak some Mandarin; Marian Falski, a senior bureaucrat with the Polish Ministry of Education in charge of all primary schools in Poland; and the famous scientist Paul Langevin of the College de France. Bonnet joined the group as he was serving as the director of the Paris-based Institution of Intellectual Co-operation, and the League wanted someone outside of the educational system to serve as the chairman of the group. On 30 August 1931, the group left for China and saw first-hand the furious protests that erupted all over China in response to the Japanese invasion of Manchuria which started on 19 September 1931. Despite the fact that most of the university and high school students in China were protesting the loss of Manchuria, the group was able to have cordial talks with Chinese educational officials about possible reforms and in 1932 released the book The Reorganisation of Education in China. In 1932, Bonnet headed the French delegation at the Lausanne Conference, where he first met Franz von Papen, who was serving as the German chancellor. During the Lausanne Conference, British Prime Minister Ramsay MacDonald, commenting on Bonnet's abilities, asked: "Why isn't he in the Cabinet?".

In 1933, Bonnet was a prominent member of the French delegation to the London Conference, where he was a leading critic of President Franklin D. Roosevelt's actions during the conference. In 1936, Bonnet emerged as the leader of 18 Radical deputies who objected to their party's participation in the Front Populaire. Bonnet was regarded as the leader of the right-wing of the Radical Socialist party, which despite its name was neither radical nor socialist. As a result, the French Socialist Premier Léon Blum effectively exiled Bonnet in January 1937 by appointing him Ambassador to the United States, even though Bonnet did not speak English. Upon hearing of Bonnet's appointment, the American Ambassador to France, William Christian Bullitt, Jr. wrote to President Franklin D. Roosevelt about Bonnet: "I don't think you'll like him. He is extremely intelligent and competent on economic and financial matters, but he's not a man of character. You may remember that he led the French delegation to the London economic conference where he led the attacks against you". Despite his short stay in the United States and his inability to speak English, Bonnet thereafter and for the rest of his life claimed to be an expert on all things American. 

On 28 June 1937, Bonnet returned to France when the Premier Camille Chautemps appointed him Finance Minister. Bonnet's first major act as Finance Minister was to oversee the devaluation of the franc (the second devaluation in less than nine months), with the value of the franc going from 110.8 francs per British pound to 147.20. The devaluation was forced on Bonnet by the fact that the 10 billion francs that had been set aside in September 1936 in a currency Reserve Fund to defend the value of the franc following the devaluation of that year had been spent by the middle of 1937. As Finance Minister, Bonnet imposed sharp cuts in military spending. Bonnet felt that the costs of the arms race with Germany were such that it was better for France to reach an understanding that might end the arms race than continue to spend gargantuan sums on the military.  Besides for the economic problems associated with budgetary stability and his attempts to maintain the value of the franc against currency speculation, Bonnet was concerned with the social conflict caused by the need for increased taxation and decreased social services to pay for arms.

In a meeting with Franz von Papen, the German Ambassador to Austria, in November 1937, Bonnet and Chautemps expressed the hope that an understanding might be reached in which France might accept Central and Eastern Europe as Germany's exclusive sphere of influence in return for German acceptance of Western Europe as France's sphere of influence. Moreover, Bonnet became the leading spokesman within the French Cabinet for the idea that the French alliance system in Eastern Europe, the so-called cordon sanitaire, was a net liability that only served to embroil France in conflicts with Germany. Throughout his career, Bonnet was noted as an advocate of "sacred egoism", namely that French interests should always take precedence over the interests of other nations. Bonnet regarded himself as a "realist", and his thinking on foreign policy tended to be colored in equal measure by pragmatism and insularity.

Bonnet's cuts in military spending led to a clash with the War Minister Édouard Daladier. Daladier persuaded the Cabinet to rescind the most severe cuts to the French Army budget, pointing out that in the current international climate, the Army needed more funding, not less. Since the Ministers of the Air and the Marine were not as substantial personalities as Daladier, the French Navy and French Air Force were not able to reverse the Finance Minister's cuts  In January 1938, following the fall of Chautemps's government, Bonnet made a serious effort to form a new government, but in the end, had to content himself with being appointed Minister of State.

Foreign Minister of the republic, 1938–1939

Appointment as foreign minister 
In April 1938, following the fall of the second Blum government, Bonnet was appointed Foreign Minister under Daladier as Premier (despite their quarrel in 1937, they had reconciled). In 1938–1939, there were three factions within the French government. One, the "peace lobby" led by Bonnet, felt that France could not afford an arms race with Nazi Germany and sought a détente with the Reich. As an expert in financial matters and a former Finance minister, Bonnet was acutely aware of the damages inflicted by the arms race on an economy already weakened by the Great Depression. A second faction, led by Paul Reynaud, Jean Zay, and Georges Mandel, favored a policy of resistance to German expansionism.  A third faction, led by Daladier, stood halfway between the other two and favored appeasement of Germany to buy time to re-arm. The American historian Ernest R. May wrote: "Small and dapper with a pointed long nose and a prominent Adam's apple, Georges Bonnett was privately mocked behind his back for overdoing the bidding of his young, sensual and well-to-do wife, Odette Pelletan...But Bonnet was no lightweight...As a minister, he worked long hours, always knew his briefs and had formidable skill at parliamentary intrigue". The secretary-general of the Quai d'Orsay, Alexis St. Léger, later wrote that of the many foreign ministers he served, Bonnet was the worse as he described Bonnet as a man committed to appeasement.

Daladier left foreign policy largely to Bonnet as the best way of avoiding a war with Germany in 1938. In addition, Daladier felt that the best way of watching Bonnet was to include him in the Cabinet: he wished to keep the Front populaire together, but Bonnet wanted to pull the Radical Socialists out of the Popular Front. Daladier's thought if Bonnet were outside of the Cabinet, his ability to engage in intrigues to break up the Front populaire and seize the Premiership for himself would be correspondingly increased; including him in the Cabinet limited his room to maneuver. The Radical Socialist party, which had a largely lower-middle class membership, was divided between a left-liberal wing associated with Daladier that was willing to accept participation in the Front populaire as a way to defend France from fascism both at home and abroad vs. a right-wing "neo-radical" wing associated with Bonnet that saw the participation in the Front populaire as a betrayal of the party's traditional defense of private property and capitalism. The "neo-radical" wing  of the Radicals tended to support appeasement and saw the foreign policy of the Front populaire as potentially leading France into a disastrous war with Germany that would only benefit the Soviet Union. Through the Radicals were mostly the party of farmers, small businessmen and tradesmen, the party was dependent upon donations from wealthier businessmen, and the "neo-radical" Bonnet's presence in an influential position as the foreign minister helped Daladier resist pressure from the more conservative Radical deputies, senators and the industrialists to pull the party out of the  Front populaire. An additional complication in the Daladier-Bonnet relationship was posed by Bonnet's desire for the Premiership, which gradually led to a breakdown with his once warm relations with Daladier.

Bonnet was extremely critical of what he regarded as the "warmongers" of the Quai d'Orsay, and from the very beginning of his time as Foreign Minister, he tended to exclude his senior officials from the decision-making progress, preferring instead to concentrate authority in his own hands. In Bonnet's opinion, the Franco-Czechoslovak treaty of 1924 committing France to come to the aid of the Czech and Slovaks in the event of a German invasion was a millstone that could lead France into a war with Germany that would be disastrous. Bonnet believed that the best course for France in 1938 was to pressure the Czechoslovak government into conceding to German demands in order to prevent a Franco-German war. Alternatively, if the Czechoslovaks refused to make concessions, then that refusal could be used as an excuse for ending the Franco-Czechoslovak alliance.  While pursuing this course, Bonnet not only kept his senior officials at the Quai d'Orsay uninformed, but sometimes also Daladier. This led the Premier to rebuke his Foreign Minister several times for behaving as if French foreign policy was made by "one minister."

Between 27 and 29 April 1938, Bonnet visited London with Daladier for meetings with Neville Chamberlain and Lord Halifax to discuss the possibility of a German-Czechoslovak war breaking out, and what the two governments could do to stop such a war. During the talks, the French ministers argued for firm declarations that both nations would go to war in the event of a German aggression and agreed to a British suggestion that the two nations pressure Prague into making concessions to the Sudeten Heimfront of Konrad Henlein. The London summit marked the beginning of a pattern that was to last throughout 1938, where the French would begin talks with the British by demanding a harder line against the Reich, and then agree to follow the British line. In the view of Bonnet and Daladier, these tactics allowed them to carry out their foreign policy goals while providing them with a cover from domestic critics by presenting their foreign policy as the result of British pressure. As Bonnet told Bullitt his "whole policy was based on allowing the British full latitude to work out the dispute" because otherwise, France would have to bear the main responsibility for pressuring concessions on Czechoslovakia Throughout summer 1938, Bonnet allowed most of the diplomatic pressure applied to President Edvard Beneš for concessions to Henlein to come from London. This led to sharp complaints from the British that Bonnet should do more to apply pressure on Beneš.

Bonnet's relations with Wellington Koo, the Chinese ambassador in Paris, were difficult as Bonnet was in favor of ending arms shipments to China as a way of improving relations with Japan. One of the main supply-lines that kept China fighting was the railroad linking the colony of French Indochina to China. The arms from the Soviet Union were landed at the port of Haiphong and were taken via trains to China. Bonnet's great rival, the Colonial minister, Georges Mandel, allowed the Soviet arms to be transshipped via French Indochina, over the intense protests of Bonnet who warned him that the Japanese would invade French Indochina in response. Mandel argued against Bonnet that to allow the Japanese to conquer China would make it more likely that the Japanese would try to seize French Indochina, and it was in France's own self-interest to keep China fighting. When the dispute between Bonnet and Mandel reached Daladier, he sided with the Colonial minister.

Between 9 and 14 May 1938, Bonnet attended the spring sessions of the League of Nations in Geneva. While in Geneva, Bonnet met with the Soviet Foreign Commissar Maxim Litvinov, who offered vague and evasive answers to Bonnet's questions about what the Soviet Union proposed to do in the event of a German attack on Czechoslovakia. At the same time, Bonnet was informed by the Polish and Romanian delegations at the League that if Germany invaded Czechoslovakia, they would refuse the Red Army transit rights to Czechoslovakia's aid and that any Soviet violation of their neutrality would be resisted with force. After his return to Paris, Bonnet met with a visiting Lord Halifax, where he urged Halifax to "work as hard as he could for a settlement in Czechoslovakia so that the French would not be faced with a crisis which they definitely did not want to face".  As Halifax reported to the British Cabinet, Bonnet: "wanted His Majesty's Government to put as much pressure as possible on Dr. Beneš to reach a settlement with the Sudeten-Deutsch in order to save France from the cruel dilemma between dishonouring her agreement [the Franco-Czechoslovak alliance of 1924] or becoming involved in war".

The May Crisis 
During the May Crisis of 1938, on 21 May, Bonnet advised Lord Halifax that Britain should warn Berlin that if the Germans attacked Czechoslovakia, then Britain would become involved in the ensuing war, only to be informed that London had already delivered such a warning. In a talk with the British Ambassador, Sir Eric Phipps, Bonnet attacked Beneš for ordering partial Czechoslovak mobilization without informing France first and criticized Prague's for its "hasty action", but at a meeting with the Czechoslovak Minister to Paris, Štefan Osuský, on 21 May, Bonnet did not criticize Prague in violation of his promises to Phipps. Phipps urged Bonnet to use the crisis as an excuse to renounce the Franco-Czechoslovak alliance of 1924, but Bonnet refused unless France could secure a stronger commitment from Britain to come to France's aid in the event of war with Germany. Throughout the 1938 crisis, Count Johannes von Welczeck, the German ambassador in Paris, reported to Berlin statements from Daladier and especially Bonnet that seemed to suggest that France would not to go to war if Germany invaded Czechoslovakia. Adamthwaite wrote if the dispatches that Count von Welczeck were sending back to Berlin recording what Bonnet had told him were public knowledge in France in 1938, then Bonnet would almost certainly would have been forced to resign in disgrace.  

During the crisis, Bonnet issued a cautiously worded press statement supporting Prague, but refused to issue a démarche in Berlin. At a subsequent meeting with Phipps on 22 May, Bonnet was informed not to interpret the British warnings to Berlin during the May Crisis as a blank cheque of British support for either Czechoslovakia or France.  Bonnet took "copious notes" on the British message and stated: "if Czechoslovakia were really unreasonable, the French Government might well declare that France considered herself released from her bond". On 25 May 1938, Bonnet told Count von Welczeck that France would honour her alliance with Czechoslovakia should Germany invade that nation and highlighted his main foreign policy goals when he declared: "if the problem of the minorities in Czechoslovakia was settled peacefully, economic and disarmament problems might be considered".  Welczeck reported to Berlin on 25 May 1938 that Bonnet had told him during the same meeting that France "recognised the effort" made by German to prevent the May crisis from turning into a war. Bonnet's account of the meeting recorded him as saying: "I pointed out to Count Welczeck that if I had not asked him officially to come earlier it was because I feared that in this period of tension it might have been considered that I was making a comminatory démarche". On 26 May 1938, Bonnet received a note from Colonel Józef Beck, the foreign minister of Poland, that promised that Poland would go to war against Germany if France did even though the Franco-Polish alliance was only a defensive one and he was ready for "a friendly discussion of all new phenomena in Central Europe, based on a mutual understanding of the interests of France and Poland". Bonnet was not interested in Beck's offer and did not reply.

On 31 May 1938, Bonnet refused a British request for an Anglo-French démarche to Beneš demanding concessions to the Sudeten German Heimfront, but promised to commit the French Minister in Prague, Victor de Lacroix, to do more to pressure the Czechoslovaks. In his instructions to Lacroix for the démarche, Bonnet instead merely asked for more information and stated: "The information that you have transmitted to me on the state of the negotiations between the Prime Minister and the representatives of the Sudetens does not allow me to pronounce as fully as the British Government believes itself able to do on the character and substance of M. Henlein's proposals...I ask you, therefore to obtain urgently the necessary details on the proposals submitted to M. Hodža." The British discovery of Bonnet's instructions, which Lacroix inadvertently revealed to the British Minister in Prague, Sir Basil Newton, led to much Anglo-French recrimination.

The Sudetenland crisis

Bonnet was the leading voice for appeasement in France. He was a "munichois"—that is, a defeatist and pacifist. The British historian Martin Thomas described Bonnet as the most "active" voice for the appeasement of Japan in the French cabinet as he argued that French Indochina, the most profitable French colony in the world, was militarily indefensible and that France must not provoke Japan via support for China. From June 1938 onward, the prospect of war with Germany made Bonnet more in favor of the appeasement of Japan as believed that Japan would take advantage of war in Europe to seize French Indochina. Throughout the spring and early summer of 1938, Bonnet refused to apply pressure on Czechoslovakia through official channels and instead used unofficial emissaries to carry the message that France might not go to war in the event of a German invasion, leading Prague to place more assurance on French statements of public support that was warranted. Bonnet had his friend, the journalist Jules Saurerwein, tell Beneš in an interview: "Victory is not a state that endures forever". Not until 17 July 1938 did Bonnet issue a set of instructions to Lacroix, which explicitly warned Beneš and his Prime Minister, Milan Hodža that because of the attitude of the British, France could not risk a war in 1938, and Prague should do its utmost to reach a settlement with Germany. 

Starting with the May Crisis, Bonnet began a campaign of lobbying the United States to become involved in European affairs, asking that Washington inform Prague that in the event of a German-Czechoslovak war the "Czech government would not have the sympathy of the American government if it should not attempt seriously to produce a peaceful solution...by making concessions to the Sudeten Germans which would satisfy Hitler and Henlein". In a meeting with the American Ambassador William Christian Bullitt, Jr. on 16 May 1938, Bonnet stated his belief that another war with Germany would be more dreadful then any previous war and that Bonnet "would fight to the limit against the involvement of France in the war".  As part of his effort to gain Bullitt's trust, Bonnet showed the American notes received from the British ambassador, Sir Eric during the May crisis. In a radio broadcast sent directly to the United States on 4 July 1938, Bonnet proclaimed his belief in the "common ideals" that linked France and the United States as a way of pressuring for greater American interest in the crisis in Central Europe.

In June 1938, there was a major dispute between Daladier and Bonnet over the question of continuing French arms shipments to the Republican side in the Spanish Civil War. The Italian intervention in the Spanish Civil War had created a major strategic problem for French policy-makers. Because of Germany's greater population, it was considered crucial in France to tap the vast manpower of North Africa to compensate for it. This strategy required French control of the western Mediterranean to ensure that no inference would be possible with troop convoys from Algeria to Marseilles. As a result of the Italian intervention in Spain's civil war, a number of Italian bases had been set up in the strategic Balearic Islands. It was widely feared in France that the Italians would at least receive permission from the Spanish Nationalists to make their presence in the Balerics permanent or even would ask for and receive the cession of the Balearics. The prospect of a Franco-German war breaking out with the Italians siding with the latter and using the Balearics to make naval and air attacks on French troop convoys was considered to be highly undesirable by French decision-makers and a major objective of French foreign policy in the late 1930s was to remove the Italians from the Balearics. Daladier was in favor of continuing arms shipments to the Spanish Republicans as long as the Italian forces were in Spain, but Bonnet argued for ending arms supplies as a way of improving relations with Italy and even told Phipps] that his country should "lay great stress with Daladier on the importance to the Pyrenees frontier remaining closed". It was Bonnet's hope that ending arms supplies for the Spanish Republic would be reciprocated by a total Italian withdraw from all Spanish territory, especially the Balearics. Bonnet was successful in having the frontier closed.

Following reports from General Joseph Vuillemin of the French Air Force after a visit to Germany about the strength of the Luftwaffe, and a memo from André François-Poncet, the French Ambassador to Germany, on 18 August 1938 stating it was quite likely that Adolf Hitler planned to attack Czechoslovakia sometime soon, Bonnet began quite insistent that a joint Anglo-French warning be sent to Berlin against plans to invade Czechoslovakia. On 22 August 1938, Bonnet had Charles Corbin, the French Ambassador in London, press for an explicit British commitment to come to France's side in the event of war breaking out in Central Europe and used the ensuing British refusal as a reason to justify France's lack of intervention in a possible German-Czechoslovak conflict. Starting in August 1938, Bonnet started to become hostile towards what he felt was Daladier's excessive belligerence and lack of willingness to compromise with the Germans and often urged in private that Daladier change his stance. 

On 9 August 1938, Welczeck reported to Berlin that Bonnet had told him earlier that day: "we [the French] would have to go to the extreme limits of compromise in the Sudeten German question, even though this did not suit the Czechs". On 12 August 1938, Bonnet in a memo to Daladier attacked Beneš for proposing to increase the length of military service in Czechoslovakia to three years, which he warned would offend Hitler. In the same memo, Bonnet warned against staff talks among the general staffs of France, Czechoslovakia and the Soviet Union as likely to offend Germany. Bonnet however went on to recommend informal contacts via the French military and air attaches in Moscow to find out what forces the Soviets planned to send to Czechoslovakia and to finally learn the answer to the long-sought question, namely what precise route the Red Army planned to take on its way to Czechoslovakia? Bonnet promised to also use the influence of the Quai d'Orsay to bring in the general staffs of Poland and Romania. Only at the end did Bonnet reveal what Thomas called the "sting in the tail", namely he also planned to keep the British government fully informed and he knew very well that the Chamberlain government would object to even the limited, informal talks the memo had just proposed. In early September 1938, as part of his effort to prevent war through a mixture of threat and conciliation, Bonnet had a series of meetings with Count Welczeck, telling him that France would honor the terms of the Franco-Czechoslovak treaty should the Germans invade Czechoslovakia, while insisting that his government was quite open to a compromise solution.

On 2 September 1938, Bonnet informed Welczeck that "France was definitely going to stand by its commitments". However, Welczeck also wrote that Bonnet had told him: "after a repetition of the general peace talk, which I have often heard from him, he added that...he himself, Daladier and other members of the cabinet were sincere admirers of the Führer...he, Bonnet, wished for nothing more ardently than to see the Führer in Paris as the guest of the French government...In the present situation, he wanted to leave no room for doubt that France and Britain at her side, were firmly resolved to hasten to the assistance of the Czechs if they were attacked by German troops...In France and Britain, however, nothing was so ardently desired as peace...we could depend upon it, that the Czechoslovak government would be forced to accept Runciman's verdict, which in all probability would mean the fulfilment of 70, 80 or 90 percent of the Sudeten German demands". Welczeck consistently portrayed Bonnet in his reports as a man who did not want to honor France's alliances with Czechoslovakia in 1938 and Poland in 1939.

During a speech delivered on 4 September 1938 at the unveiling of a commemorative plaque at Pointe de Grave honoring La Fayette's's departure to America in 1777 and the arrival of the American Expeditionary Force in 1917, Bonnet stated obliquely that France would go to war if Germany attacked Czechoslovakia and expressed the hope that the US would fight on France's side. During the same ceremony, Ambassador Bullitt stated that "France and the United States were united in war and peace", leading to a storm of criticism by American isolationists and a statement from President Franklin D. Roosevelt that it was "100 per cent wrong" the U.S. would join a "stop-Hitler bloc". Roosevelt's statement had the effect of confirming Bonnet in his course of seeking to avoid a war with Germany. In addition, a highly exaggerated estimate of the strength of the Luftwaffe presented by Charles Lindbergh in August 1938, supplemented by a highly negative assessment of the ability of the Armée de l'Air by the Air Force's General Joseph Vuillemin to survive a war had the effect of reinforcing Bonnet's determination to avoid a war with Germany.

When it appeared quite likely in mid-September 1938 that war could break out at any moment in Central Europe following Hitler's violent speech blasting Czechoslovakia on 12 September and a failed revolt in the Sudetenland, Bonnet become quite frantic in his efforts to save the peace. Bonnet told Phipps: "I repeated all this with emotion to Sir Eric Phipps telling him that at no price should we allow ourselves to be involved in war without having weighted all the consequences and without having measured in particular the state of our military forces". On 14 September, Bonnet told Phipps: "We cannot sacrifice ten million men in order to prevent three and half million Sudetens joining the Reich".  Bonnet went on to advocate as his preferred solution to the crisis the neutralization of Czechoslovakia with wide-ranging autonomy for the Sudetenland, but he was prepared as a "last resort" to accept a plebiscite on the Sudetenlanders joining Germany.  During the same conversation, Bonnet "expressed great indignation with the Czechs who, it seems, mean to mobilise without consulting the French...he has therefore given a broad hint to Beneš that France may have to reconsider her obligations", and that "we are not ready for war and we must therefore make the most far-reaching concessions to the Sudetens and to Germany". At a summit meeting in London with the leading British ministers on 18 September, Bonnet and Daladier agreed formally to the idea of ceding the Sudetenland to Germany, but pressed strongly as the price for making such a concession, a British guarantee of the remainder of Czechoslovakia.

On his return to Paris, in a meeting with Czechoslovaka minister to France, Štefan Osuský, Bonnet was very vehement for Prague to agree to the Anglo-French plan agreed to in London at once. In a letter to Daladier on 24 September 1938, Bonnet wrote: "If France declared war against Germany, her position would be weaker than at any time since 1919. In fact, France in this case would have to stand alone on land the force of the combined German and Italian armies, without counting Japan, which in the Far East, will doubtless attack Indo-China...For five months, night and day, in the course of our confident collaboration, we have struggled for peace. I beg you to continue in this course. It is the only one which can save the country.". At the same time, Bonnet's relations with René Massigli, the Quai d'Orsay's Political Director, began to deteriorate quite rapidly as Massigli felt that Bonnet was too anxious to avoid a war at any price.

On 25 September 1938, Daladier and Bonnet returned to London for another set of meetings with Chamberlain and Lord Halifax; during this summit, Bonnet said almost nothing. The man Bonnet most feared in September 1938 was Litvinov, whom he was convinced would make an offer of Soviet support that would ensure that Beneš rejected the Anglo-French peace plan that just been imposed on him, which in turn would lead to Germany invading Czechoslovakia. When Britain rejected Hitler's Bad Godesberg ultimatum on 26 September, Bonnet sought to prevent the news of the British rejection appearing in the French press, as it now appeared that British were pushing the French towards war, and deprived Bonnet of using British pressure as an excuse. As the crisis reached its climax in late September 1938, Bonnet called upon his "peace lobby", a collection of various politicians, journalists and industrialists to pressure the Cabinet against going to war for Czechoslovakia. Some of the prominent members of Bonnet's "peace lobby" were the politicians' Jean Mistler, Henri Bérenger, Jean Montigny, Anatole de Monzie, François Piétri, Lucien Lamoureux, Joseph Caillaux, the industrialist Marcel Boussac, and the journalists Jacques Sauerwein, Emile Roche, Léon Bassée, and Emmanuel Berl. Together with Bonnet, the peace lobby sought to influence the government both within the corridors of power and by appealing to public opinion. In this regard, Bonnet especially valued the contribution of his close friend Bassée, who served as the political director of the Havas news agency. Another unofficial member of the "peace lobby" was Phipps, whose dispatches to London often reflected Bonnet's influence. The most celebrated of Phipps's dispatches was a message on 24 September 1938 which claimed that "all that is best in France is against war, almost at any price" and that they were opposed by a "small, but noisy and corrupt, war group".

In the aftermath of the British rejection of the Bad Godesberg ultimatum, Daladier stated at a Cabinet meeting that if Hitler persisted with the terms of the ultimatum, France "intended to go to war".  At a Cabinet meeting on 27 September, Bonnet spoke out against French mobilization and threatened to resign if the Cabinet were to order such a step. The atmosphere at the Cabinet meeting was very tense as Daladier insisted upon mobilization, which led to many heated words between the Premier and his Foreign Minister. At the cabinet meeting of 27 September 1938, Bonnet's case was greatly helped by the report of General Vuillemin who stated that most of the aircraft of the Armée de l'Air were obsolete and that in the event of war, 40% of all French aircraft would be destroyed within the first month and 64% in the first two months of war. Bonnet used Vuillemin's report at a cabinet meeting on 27 September with great effect, and two hours after the meeting, Daladier agreed with him that France must avoid a war at almost any cost.

The crisis was suddenly averted on 28 September, when Chamberlain announced in the House of Commons that he had received an invitation from Benito Mussolini for a four-power conference to be held on 30 September in Munich to settle the crisis. Bonnet was very much in favor of the Munich conference of 30 September, which averted the war Bonnet opposed, but he was not part of the French delegation to the Munich conference as Daladier was afraid of what he might do if he attended the conference.  After the Munich Conference, Bonnet visited his hometown of Périgueux, where he was greeted with a deluge of flowers and shouts of "Vive Bonnet!" and "Merci Bonnet!" Bonnet who long been opposed to the Radical Socialists taking part in the Front populaire used the Communist demonstrations against the Munich Agreement as an argument for pulling the Radicals out of the 'Front populaire. Bonnet saw France as primarily as a "Mediterrean" nation that should not be involved in Eastern Europe, and believed the Munich Agreement was the beginning of a disengagement from Eastern Europe that would allow France to focus on its colonial empire and its interests in the Mediterrean.

From Munich to Prague
Relations between Bonnet and his officials at the Quai d'Orsay, especially René Massigli were very poor, leading to Bonnet to condemn Massigli quite strongly in his memoirs. In turn, Massigli accused Bonnet of seeking to alter the documentary record in his favor by falsifying and burning documents. In the aftermath of Munich, relations between Bonnet and Massigli, which were poor to begin with, declined even further. On 24 October 1938, Bonnet had Massigli sacked as the Quai d'Orsay's Political Director and exiled him by having him serve as Ambassador to Turkey. Massiglii first learnt that Bonnet had fired him by reading his morning newspaper.

On the same day that Massigli was exiled, Pierre Comert, the Director of the Quai d'Orsay's Press Service, whose news releases during the Czechoslovak crisis were not in accord with the line that Bonnet wanted to hear, was sent off to the American department. Bonnet had also wanted to sack the Quai d'Orsay's Secretary-General Alexis Saint-Legér Léger and replace him with a man more in tune with his policies, but Saint-Legér Léger's increasing friendship with Daladier served to protect him. A popular legend has it that Saint-Legér Léger was not fired because he knew too much about stock market speculations that Bonnet was alleged to have engaged in during the war crisis of September 1938, but there is no evidence to support this story. In the aftermath of the purge, Bonnet was congratulated by Phipps for removing the "warmongers" Massigli and Comert from the Quai d'Orsay, but Phipps went on to complain that the "warmonger" Saint-Legér Léger should have been sacked as well. In response, Bonnet claimed that he and Saint-Legér Léger saw "eye to eye", leading to Phipps, who knew about the true state of relations between the two to remark drily, "in that case the eyes must be astigmatic". On 2 October 1938, the Royal Marine General Sir Maurice Hankey who served as the chairman of the Committee of Imperial Defense wrote in his diary about the recent visit to Paris by the anti-appeasement Conservative MPs  Sir Winston Churchill and Sir Edward Spears to contact anti-appeasement politicians in France: "Winston Churchill's sudden visit to France by aeroplane, accompanied by General Spears, and his visit only to the members of the French government like Mandel, who is opposed to the policy of peace, was most improper-Bonnet, the French Foreign Minister has complained about it, asking what we would say if our prominent French statesmen did the same: he has also protested against being rung up by Churchill and Spears from London for information". On 12 October 1938, Bonnet told Phipps that he envisioned "some revision of France's engagements towards Russia and Poland".

On 19 October 1938, at the last meeting between the French Ambassador to Germany, André François-Poncet (who just been appointed ambassador to Italy) and Adolf Hitler, the former had suggested to the latter that a Franco-German Declaration of Friendship might offer a way of improving relations between the two countries and avoiding a repeat of the crisis of September 1938. When François-Poncet reported to Paris Hitler's favorable attitude towards such a declaration, and his willingness to send his Foreign Minister, Joachim von Ribbentrop, to Paris to sign the proposed declaration, Bonnet enthusiastically embraced the idea. Bonnet felt that such a declaration might open the way for a series of economic and cultural agreements that would end forever the prospect of another Franco-German war. Bonnet was also jealous over the Anglo-German Declaration of 30 September that Chamberlain had forced upon Hitler after the Munich Conference and wanted his own declaration.

In October 1938, the French opened secret talks with the Americans with the aim of buying American aircraft to make up productivity deficiencies in the French aircraft industry. Daladier commented in a message to President Roosevelt that: "If I had three or four thousand aircraft Munich would never have happened". The major problems in the Franco-American talks were the issue of how the French were to pay for the American aircraft and the implications of American neutrality acts about such sales. An even greater problem was the American Johnson Act forbade loans to nations that had defaulted on their debts to the United States, which the French had in 1932 when France ceased repaying the loans contracted during the First World War, making it impossible for American banks to lend money to pay for the American aircraft.  In February 1939, the French offered to cede their possessions in the Caribbean and the Pacific to the United States together with a lump sum payment of ten billion francs in exchange for the ability to access loans from American banks to buy American aircraft.

Starting in October 1938, Bonnet was increasing preoccupied with the subject of Jewish refugees from Germany who arriving in France in increasing numbers, and sought a "friendly settlement" with Germany. In November 1938, Chamberlain and Halifax visited Paris, where Bonnet told them that he was "much preoccupied with the question of Jewish immigration into France". Bonnet stated that France had accepted 40, 000 Jewish refugees, but that: "France could not a stand a Jewish immigration on a large scale. She was already saturated with foreigners, of whom there were about 3 million in the country". Bonnet complained that the United States-the favorite destination of Jewish refugees by far-was unwilling to change its immigration quotas, leading him with two alternatives, namely to send Jewish refugees to one of the European colonies in Africa and/or for Germany to permit Jews to emigrate "normally". The last statement was a reference to the practice of the Reich government of asset-stripping German Jews of almost everything they owned as the condition for leaving Germany, which led Bonnet to comment "would greatly facilitate matters" if Jewish refugees ceasing arriving in France penniless.

On 31 October 1938, Bonnet informed Count von Welczeck that he wanted to see the German draft of the Declaration of Franco-German Friendship in the near-future as he wanted to sign the declaration before 1938 ended. Bonnet warned Welczeck that the French people had celebrated the Munich Agreement-which prevented a world war in 1938-but that French public opinion was turning against the Munich Agreement with the feeling being that France had sacrificed too much in exchange for nothing in return. Bonnet expressed his concerns the declaratiojn being signed before the coming visit of Neville Chamberlain to Paris on 24 November 1938 as he stated he wanted to avoid the impression that "the agreement had been made under British tutelage". On 8 November 1938, Welczeck informed Bonnet that Ribbentrop did not share his fears about Chamberlain's visit and that signing the declaration was not viewed as an especially urgent matter in Berlin.

Throughout his career, Bonnet was widely respected for his intelligence but often inspired great mistrust in others, in part because of his highly secretive methods of working and his preference for verbal as opposed to written instructions.{ During his time as Foreign Minister, Bonnet was distrusted by the British, Daladier and senior officials in the Quai d'Orsay, all of whom suspected that he was in some way not quite being honest with them. Neville Chamberlain described Bonnet as "clever, but ambitious and an intriguer". The Colonies minister Georges Mandel said: "His long nose sniffs danger and responsibility from afar. He will hide under any flat stone to avoid it". The anti-appeasement French political columnist André Géraud, who wrote under the pen-name Pertinax, stated that Bonnet pursued only the line "of least resistance". Sir Winston Churchill described him as "the quintessence of defeatism". In December 1938, Lord Halifax's private secretary Oliver Harvey referred to Bonnet as "a public danger to his own country and to ours". In December 1939, the British Chief Diplomatic Advisor Robert Vansittart wrote: "As to M. Bonnet he had better trust to time and oblivion rather than to coloured self-defence. He did a lot of really dirty work in 1938...if I ever had to play cards with M. Bonnet again I would always run through the pack first, just to make sure that the joker had been duly removed". And throughout Berlin Diary the author William L. Shirer referred to him as "the insufferable Georges Bonnet".

Others were more sympathetic to Bonnet. Lord Halifax wrote in response to Vansittart's memo that: "I am disposed to think but I know it is a minority view that M. Bonnet is not so black (or so yellow) as he is often painted". Joseph Paul-Boncour, a political opponent of Bonnet and his predecessor as foreign minister, spoke of his great "kindness and help". The editor of Le Petit Parisien newspaper, Élie J. Bois, felt that Bonnet had "the makings of a good, perhaps a great, foreign minister". On another occasion, Bois, who disliked Bonnet, wrote of Bonnet's "features...instinct with the intelligence of a fox on the alert". Bonnet's friend, the Public Works minister Anatole de Monzie, commented: "Whilst very courageous in the long run, he is much less so in the heat of the moment...Because he is reticent, he is accused of lying or of deceit. False accusation...Bonnet is discreet so that his policy may be successful...There is in him an obvious ability, an excessive flexibility. He jumps too quickly, on to the bandwagon, on to all bandwagons. What does it matter to me?...If he aims for the goal and means to reach it by devious means, I care only for the goal. Now I note that having adopted the peace party, he is sticking to it with all the foresight of a statesman". The French historian Yvon Lacaze has argued against the popular image of Bonnet as a slick and amoral opportunist, and instead attributes Bonnet's views about avoiding another war with Germany to his memories of service in the trenches of World War I.

In the fall of 1938, Bonnet started to advocate the ending of the French alliance system in Eastern Europe and ordered his officials at the Quai d'Orsay to start preparing grounds for renouncing the French treaties with the Soviet Union and Poland. Speaking before the Foreign Affairs Commission on the Chamber of Deputies in October 1938, Bonnet spoke of his desire to "restructure" the French alliance system in Eastern Europe and of his wish to "renegotiate" treaties which might bring France into a war "when French security is not directly threatened". In his efforts to end the eastern alliances, Bonnet found his hands tied by opposition from other members of the French government. As he noted during talks in October with a group of Deputies who had formally asked the Foreign Minister to end French commitments in Eastern Europe: "If I was free, I would carry out your policy; but I am not: I would have against me the majority of the Cabinet, led by Reynaud and Mandel, and I cannot count on Daladier, for Gamelin believes that in the event of war Polish military assistance would be indispensable". As part of his general tendency towards seeking to weaken the French eastern alliances, Bonnet did his best to put off giving the international guarantee to Czecho-Slovakia that France had promised in the Munich Agreement. On 24 November during Chamberlain's visit to Paris, Bonnet deprecated the Franco-Soviet alliance, which he dismissed as being inconsequential and told Chamberlain that the alliance would never come into effect if a German-sponsored Ukrainian nationalist movement were to win Soviet Ukraine independence from the Soviet Union.

On 25 November 1938, Bonnet informed the French Ambassador to Poland, Léon Noël, that France should find an excuse for terminating the 1921 Franco-Polish alliance, but found that his views on this issue created considerable opposition within the Quai d'Orsay, where it was argued that Poland was too valuable an ally to be abandoned, and that if France renounced the Polish alliance, Warsaw would align herself with Berlin. On 30 November 1938, there were what were very misleadingly described as "spontaneous" demonstrations in the Italian Chamber of Deputies organized by Benito Mussolini and his Foreign Minister, Count Galeazzo Ciano, who demanded that France cede Tunisia, Corsica, Nice, and French Somaliland (modern Djibouti) to Italy. At the cue call, all of Fascist deputies rose up to scream abuse at France, which Count Ciano sought to explain away as merely an expression of the "spontaneous" rage felt by the Italian people over the French "occupation" of the lands he insisted rightfully belonged to Italy. Mussolini believed in the aftermath of the Munich Agreement that France was no longer a great power and that now was the time to pursue Italian irredentist ambitions against France. In response, Bonnet sent out a message to François-Poncet, now the French Ambassador in Rome, to inform him that he should see Count Ciano to complain: "Such behavior may appear rather unusual in the presence of the French Ambassador and immediately following the unconditional recognition of the Italian Empire", referring to the French recognition of the annexation of Ethiopia.

In December 1938, during the visit of the German Foreign Minister Joachim von Ribbentrop to Paris to sign the largely meaningless Franco-German Declaration of Friendship, Ribbentrop had conversations with Bonnet that he later claimed included a promise to him that France would recognize all of Eastern Europe as Germany's exclusive sphere of influence. Ribbentrop was to use Bonnet's statement to convince Hitler that France would not go to war in the defence of Poland in 1939. Both Bonnet and Saint-Legér Léger were quite vehement in insisting that no such remark was ever made. Bonnet spent much of 6–7 December 1938 talking to Ribbentrop about the need about a "solution to the Jewish problem", by which he meant shipping Jewish refugees to the French colony of Madagascar. On 15 December 1938, Bonnet gave his account of his meeting with Ribbentrop at the Hotel Crillon on 7 December 1938 to Edwin C. Wilson, the counsellor of the American embassy, where he mentioned no moral objections to Nazi policies and instead asked for Germany to be "more reasonable". The Canadian historian Michael Marrus and the American historian Robert O. Paxton wrote: "On the subject of Madagascar, Bonnet's postwar version is entirely misleading".

In January 1939, Bonnet commissioned a study for the French cabinet that concluded that the 1935 Franco-Soviet alliance was now defunct, and there were no grounds for hope about help from the Soviet Union. Rumours in the French press over the winter of 1938–39 that France was seeking the end of the eastern alliances generated concerns both in the Chamber of Deputies and in the press, leading Bonnet to state in a speech to the Chamber on 26 January 1939: "So, gentlemen, let us dispose of the legend that our policy has destroyed the engagements that we have contracted in Eastern Europe with the USSR and with Poland. These engagements remain in force and they must be applied in the same spirit in which they were conceived". In response to Bonnet's speech, Ribbentrop summoned the French Ambassador to Germany, Robert Coulondre, on 6 February 1939 to offer a formal protest over his speech. Ribbentrop told Coulondre that because of Bonnet'  statement of 6 December 1938 accepting Eastern Europe as Germany's zone of influence meant that "France's commitments in Eastern Europe" were now "off limits", a claim which stunned Coulondre.

Besides seeking to end the cordon sanitaire, Bonnet's major initiative in foreign policy after Munich was a series of economic agreements he sought to negotiate with the Germans. Bonnet's economic diplomacy was intended to achieve four goals:
End Great Depression in France;
Like many other appeasers on both sides of the Channel, Bonnet believed that German foreign policy was driven by economic grievances, not by Nazi racial theories about Lebensraum, which Bonnet considered farfetched as he felt that the Nazis did not take their ideology seriously. Thus, in Bonnet's view arrangements to offer Germany greater prosperity would tame German complaints against the existing international order and reduce international tension.
Like other economic experts around the world in the 1930s, Bonnet was disturbed by the implications of the increasing tendency in Germany towards protectionism, currency manipulation, use of "blocked accounts" for foreign businesses in Germany and foreign holders of German debt, autarky, a growing etatism in the German economy, and the German drive to create their own economic zone in Europe. Bonnet felt that Franco-German economic agreements would at least ensure that France would not be locked out of the German economic sphere of influence and even moderate some of the more worrisome German economic practices.
He wanted a Franco-German friendship that would both banish the prospect of another war, and end the arms race that had placed such a burden on the French economy.

However, during the winter of 1938–1939, negotiations with the Germans proceeded slowly, in large part because the Germans refused to abandon the economic policies that caused such concern. The atmosphere, following the German destruction of Czecho-Slovakia (as Czechoslovakia had been renamed), on 15 March 1939 was not considered conductive for France to be pursuing any sort of agreements with the Germans, and the talks were called off, never to be resumed. At the same time, Bonnet ordered Charles Corbin, the French Ambassador in London to warn Chamberlain and Lord Halifax during their scheduled visit to Rome in January 1939 against any weakening of Anglo-French relations in exchange for improved Anglo-Italian relations. During a meeting between François-Poncet and Count Ciano, the Italian Foreign Minister claimed that the anti-French demonstrations were purely "spontaneous" and did not reflect the views of his government. As part of an effort to gain British support against the Italian campaign, Bonnet issued a statement that France would always rush to Britain's aid in the event of aggression, hoping that his statement might lead to a similar British statement of support for France. In January 1939, a pro-appeasement British newspaper proprietor, Kenneth de Courcy, reported after a visit to Paris: "Monsieur Bonnet seems to be generally distrusted by most Frenchmen of the centre and right". However, the most fierce criticism of Bonnet came from the French left who saw him as a someone who was all too willing to make deals with fascist regimes.

In early January 1939, Bonnet and Daladier approved of the idea of sending the banker Paul Baudoin as an unofficial diplomat to find out just what exactly the Italians wanted from France. The reasoning for the Baudoin mission was if the price of Italian friendship was not too expensive, it might be worth paying as a way of detaching Italy from Germany, thus reducing France's potential enemies. When Baudoin visited Rome in February 1939, he reported that the Italians were asking for only some economic concessions from the French in the Horn of Africa and Italian representation on the board of the Compagnie universelle du canal maritime de Suez. However, before any decisions were made in Paris about accepting the Italian demands or not, the news of Baudoin's secret visit was leaked to the French press, forcing Bonnet to disavow Baudoin. In response to furious complaints from François-Poncet about Baudoin's mission, which he had first learned about after the story had been leaked, Bonnet replied to François-Poncet: "The rumors you are telling me have no basis in fact. You are fully aware that any conversation, any Franco-Italian negotiation official or unofficial could only be handled by you, and that no direct or indirect transaction could not be considered outside your purview".

In January 1939, negotiations were opened between the French and Turkey over resolving the Hatay dispute. Leading the French delegation were Gabriel Puaux, the High Commissioner of Syria and Massigli, the French Ambassador in Ankara. The continuing feud between Massigli and Bonnet was reflected in Bonnet's habit of refusing Massigli negotiating instructions for weeks on end, thereby placing Massigli in an embarrassing situation when during his talks with the Turks. During the Franco-Turkish talks, Bonnet had first backed Puaux, against any weakening of French control over the Sanjak of Alexandretta before deciding upon settling the dispute in favor of the Turks as a way of potentially winning Turkish support in the event of a war with Germany.  Despite efforts to maintain some sort of French presence in Alexandretta, the Franco-Turkish talks were to end in June 1939, with the Turks being given total control over the disputed region.

By early 1939, it was clear that the days of the Spanish Republic were numbered, and Bonnet felt that it was time for France to recognize the Spanish Nationalists as the legitimate government of Spain (until that time, Paris had recognized the Republican government as the legitimate government). On 20 January 1939, Bonnet had a meeting with the former president of Mexico, Francisco León de la Barra, who was living in exile in Paris, and asked that de la Barra serve as an unofficial French diplomat in talks with the Spanish Nationalists. In response to reports from de la Barra that ties between General Francisco Franco and the Axis powers were strained, Bonnet then sent out Senator Léon Bérard to sound out the Nationalists about establishing diplomatic relations.

Bonnet told Bérard to inform General Jordana, the Nationalist Foreign Minister, that if General Franco was willing to promise that all German and Italian forces were to be withdrawn after the end of the Spanish Civil War, then Paris would recognize the Nationalists. The major dispute during the talks between Bérard and Jourdana was if the recognition of the Burgos government would be de jure, as Franco wanted, or de facto, as Bonnet wanted and if Franco would promise to remain neutral should a Franco-German war occur. However. by February 1939, Bonnet believed that the rapid collapse of the Republican war effort made recognition of the Burgos government imperative if France were to have any hope of having influence with General Franco, and on 28 February 1939, France broke diplomatic relations with the Republican government in Madrid and recognized the Nationalist government in Burgos. Much to the relief of Bonnet, General Franco kept his word about ensuring the withdrawal of Axis forces from Spanish territory, especially the departure of the Italians from the Balearic Islands.

In early 1939, the British Embassy in Paris was bombarded with a series of reports that public opinion in France was highly dejected and demoralized, and that unless Britain made the "continental commitment" (unequivocally linking British security to French security and committing to sending a large British Expeditionary Force to France like the one ultimately sent in World War I), the French would resign themselves to becoming a German satellite state.  These reports, which secretly originated with the French government, hoped to pressure the British into making the long-sought "continental commitment".  The French were assisted in a conspiracy of convenience by the leadership of the British Army, which disliked the funding implications of Chamberlain's "limited liability" doctrine that held that in the next war, British efforts were to be largely limited to the sea and air, army playing an ancillary role at best.

On 24 January 1939, Bonnet informed Count von Welczeck that a speech that he was going to make before the Assemblée nationale affirming France's willingness to stand by its alliances in Eastern Europe "had been framed for domestic consumption". Bonnet read out to Welczeck several excerpts from the speech he was going to give and then asked the ambassador to tell Ribbentrop not to take his speech literally. Despite Bonnet's efforts via Welczeck, Ribbentrop was enraged when he read the excerpts and ordered Welczeck to express Germany's "astonishment" that Bonnet had spoke of "fostering and extending French friendships in eastern and central Europe". On 11 February 1939, Welczeck met with Bonnet. The French and German records of the meeting contradict each other. In the French version of the meeting, Bonnet defended the speech he gave before the Chamber of Deputies on 26 January 1939 while the German version of the meeting Bonnet apologized for the speech, saying that it did not reflect his views on foreign policy at all. Welczeck had Bonnet saying to him: "Things were often said during a foreign affairs debate, which were obviously designed for domestic consumption...If a French foreign minister, against the storm and wave of opposition, substantiated our claims to the Sudeten German territory...and then drew his own conclusions privately from the changed situation in Central Europe, he could not be expected to withdraw all along the line when facing the Chamber."

The French effort for a British "continental commitment" was given a huge and unexpected boost by the "Dutch war scare" of January 1939. In response to the "Dutch war scare", which gripped London in late January 1939 when the British government received false reports of an imminent German invasion of the Netherlands, Halifax had Phipps inquire what France would do if such an invasion took place.  The Germans were then believed to have planned to overrun the Netherlands and use Dutch airfields to launch a bombing campaign meant to achieve a knockout blow against Britain, and raze British cities to the ground. The French attitude towards a German invasion of the Netherlands was crucial because France was the only country in Western Europe that possessed an army large enough and modern enough to save the Dutch. Moreover, the importance of France to British security had increased following a violent anti-British propaganda campaign launched in Germany in November 1938, which had led the Chamberlain government to perceive German foreign policy as anti-British. This scare was combined with rumours that Bonnet was secretly attempting to negotiate a Franco-German "special relationship" that might leave Britain facing a hostile Germany without any allies who possessed the large armies that Britain lacked. In response to Phipps's message, Bonnet had Corbin inform Lord Halifax that the French attitude towards German aggression towards the Netherlands would depend upon what the British attitude towards France was if the latter were the victim of aggression. Chamberlain stated to the House of Commons on 6 February 1939 that any German attack on France would automatically be considered an attack on Britain, thereby leading the British to make the "continental commitment" to send a large army to the defense of France that successive French diplomats had struggled to obtain since 1919. In a newspaper column on 11 March 1939, Pertinax wrote that Bonnet ruled his ministry in an autocratic style as he wrote: "In theory, foreign policy is conducted by the entire cabinet, the ministers being collectively responsible for their actions. In reality, the Minister of Foreign Affairs is absolute master of his department".

In March 1939, following the German destruction of the rump state of Czecho-Slovakia and the proclamation of the Reich Protectorate of Bohemia-Moravia, Bonnet had Hervé Alphand of the Ministry of Commerce, who was in Berlin to negotiate a trade treaty, recalled in protest. The violation of the Munich Agreement badly damaged Bonnet's creditability, and as part of the aftermath, 17 French intellectuals sent out a letter calling for an inquiry into Bonnet's conduct of foreign affairs. Ties between Daladier and Bonnet were strained when in protest over the German coup, Daladier ordered the recall of Robert Coulondre, the French Ambassador to Germany, without consulting Bonnet, who was much offended by Daladier's act.  Welczeck reported that Bonnet had told him that he had no official opinion about the occupation, but his "personal view" was that "the peace and appeasement policy of the 'men of Munich' had suffered a lamentable disaster...in every country warmongers who would lead Europe catastrophe were bound to gain the upper hand".

The Danzig crisis and the "peace front"
During the Tilea Affair of March 1939, when the Romanian government, as part of an effort to enlist British support against German demands for the control of the Romanian oil industry, had the Romanian Minister in London Virgil Tilea make a series of highly misleading statements to the British government to the effect that they were under the verge of an immediate German invasion, Bonnet happened to be in London as part of the company accompanying the state visit of President Albert Lebrun.  The importance of Romania was that Germany possessed no oil of its own and was highly-dependent on oil from the New World (the coal liquefaction plants that were to supply Germany with oil during World War II were not yet in operation). As such, a naval blockade of Germany would have highly damaging effects on the German economy, and conversely, a German seizure of Romania would undermine the effectiveness of a blockade. When the war scare began on 18 March 1939, Bonnet's first response was to inform the Romanians that they should accept aid from the Soviet Union as there was nothing France could do to save them. The Romanians rejected the French advice while Jakob Suritz, the Soviet Ambassador to France, stated the Soviet Union would take no initiatives in resisting German aggression in Eastern Europe, and France must show the way. 

During an emergency meeting with Halifax on 20 March, Bonnet sought to shift responsibility to dealing with the crisis onto British shoulders and strongly suggested that the ideal state for saving Romania and its oil was Poland.  Bonnet argued that Britain should take the lead in persuading the Poles to come to Romania's aid and suggested that if Poland were involved, then perhaps the Romanians might be persuaded to accept Soviet aid as well. Bonnet's reasons for arguing that Britain should take the lead in persuading Poland to come to Romania's aid were his fear that if France made such an effort, the price of Polish support would a tightening of the Franco-Polish alliance, which was counter to Bonnet's general policy of seeking to weaken France's eastern alliances.

On 23 March 1939, while President Lebrun was having lunch with the royal family at Windsor Castle, Bonnet had another meeting with Lord Halifax, Bonnet mentioned that he had received a series of messages from François-Poncet, claiming that it would create a highly negative impression on Mussolini and would hamper efforts to detach him from his alignment with Germany if Britain and France aligned themselves with only the Soviet Union.  Bonnet's statement was to lead the British government into considering the idea of making a "guarantee" of Polish independence as the best way of securing Polish support for Romania. In this way, Bonnet played a major, if indirect role in the progress leading to the British "guarantee" of Poland on 31 March 1939. On 30 March 1939, Phipps told Bonnet that Chamberlain would be announcing the "guarantee" of Poland the next day and asked for his approval, which Bonnet granted without informing the rest of the French cabinet.  Daladier was enraged with Bonnet for giving his approval of the "guarantee"" as he remarked to the French cabinet the next day: "the guarantee goes a long way, indeed further than our own alliance, because the decision to engage Britain's entire military strength will rest in Warsaw". With the British "guarantee", Daladier had lost leverage over Colonel Beck, who now had two great power allies instead of one, and it soon dawned on him that Bonnet had approved of the British "guarantee" as a way to sabotage Daladier's policy of restructuring the Franco-Polish alliance to confront the Reich. Marshal Gamelin was likewise to complain that the Chamberlain should forced Beck to grant transit rights to the Red Army as a precondition of the "guarantee" instead of giving the "guarantee" unconditionally, which meant that both Britain and France had lost leverage over Colonel Beck. Following the British "guarantee" of Polish independence on 31 March 1939, followed by the announcements that London wished to build a "peace front" to resist aggression in April 1939, Bonnet felt there was now a great opportunity of building an Anglo-French-Soviet combination that might deter Germany from war.

On 14 April 1939, Bonnet had a meeting with Suritz, and asked  "in a form to be determined" for the Soviet Union to provide military support for Poland and Romania if those nations were attacked by Germany. Bonnet suggested to Suritz that an Annexe to the Franco-Soviet Pact of 1935 should be added which would declare the Soviet Union would go to war if Germany attacked either Poland or Romania. In particular, Bonnet stated: "It was obvious that there had to be an agreement between the USSR and Romania or the USSR and Poland for the Franco-Soviet Pact to come usefully into play". Suritz commented that unless the Poles and Romanians allowed the Red Army transit rights, there was little that the Soviet Union could do for those nations, leading Bonnet to reply that he felt he could pressure both nations into agreeing to provide the desired transit rights. Bonnet commented that he felt it was time to "begin immediate discussions between France and the USSR in order to precisely determine the help the USSR could provide to Romania and Poland in the event of German aggression".

In April 1939, Bonnet in turn went behind Daladier's back in suggesting for Britain to apply pressure on the French premier to make more concessions to Italy regarding the Franco-Italian disputes over influence in the Mediterranean and the Red Sea regions. The differences in opinion between Daladier and Bonnet over the question of making concessions to Italy, which Daladier was firmly opposed to, led Daladier increasingly to take control of foreign policy by dealing directly with the Quai d'Orsay's Secretary-General Alexis Saint-Legér Léger and pushing Bonnet aside from April 1939 onwards. On 27 April 1939, Phipps told Bonnet that the Chamberlain government had hopes that "a serious attempt would be made to reestablish contact between France and Italy". St. Legér was utterly opposed to Bonnet's policy of making concessions to Italy, and he had the support of Daladier who felt France should not have to make concessions to Mussolini. Later in April 1939, Daladier told the Romanian foreign minister Grigore Gafencu "he was going to get rid of Bonnet quite shortly", and on 6 May, Daladier stated to Bullit he had a great deal of "...mistrust of Bonnet and said that he might replace him in the immediate future". As Count von Welczeck noted in May 1939: "Bonnet was ...a man who would go to the utmost limits to avoid a European war up to the last moment. He regretted therefore that foreign affairs were so much more in the hands of M. Daladier than M. Bonnet".

On 14 May 1939, the French charge d'affaires at the consulate in Singapore warned Bonnet that France's only hope of preventing the Imperial Japanese Navy from dominating the South China Sea was the British Royal Navy as the bulk of the French fleet was concentrated in the Mediterranean Sea and the Atlantic Ocean. Admiral François Darlan, the commander-in-chief of the French Navy, had already declared that his force's primary mission was in the Mediterranean and that the South China Sea was only a secondary concern. The report warned that in the event of the Danzig crisis turning into a war, the Japanese Navy would probably seek to dominate the South China Sea as a prelude towards the invasions of French Indochina and British Malaya, both of which were well provided with rubber plantations. Despite the report's recommendation that closer co-operation with Britain was the best way of protecting French Indochina, Bonnet remained committed towards the appeasement of Japan.

On 19 May 1939, Bonnet met with Welczeck who told him that the Reich did not want a war with France and attacked Britain for an alleged "encirclement" policy against Germany. Welczeck went on to say that France would have to bear "the main burden of the struggle conjured up by Britain and make enormous sacrifice of life" as he claimed that France was being used by Britain. It was after these statement that the French and German versions of the meeting diverged. The French version had Bonnet saying that France could not accept the use of force by Germany to resolve the Danzig crisis. The German version had Bonnet saying to Welczeck: "he [Bonnet] would never deviate from the main lines of his policy and would fight for peace to the very last. In spite of everything he held fast to the idea of bringing back co-operation with Germany...If I met unfriendliness in the French press where he had some influence, he would remedy matters, as far as lay his power". During the Danzig crisis, Bonnet found himself opposed by almost all of the officials of the Quai d'Orsay led by St. Léger who accused him of wanting to end the alliance with Poland. Morale was high in the Quai d'Orsay as one French diplomat, Jean Chauvel recalled in 1971: "But finally and most important was their conviction that Hitler could not fight a war". Chauvel stated he and the other officials worked to sabotage Bonnet's polices as he wrote: "Their practical purpose was to resist the minister's policies and if necessary, thwart any action on his part".

In contrast to his enthusiasm for improving ties with Moscow as the Danzig crisis began, Bonnet felt the opposite about relations with Warsaw. In May 1939, during talks in Paris with the Poles aimed at strengthening the political and military aspects of the Franco-Polish alliance, Bonnet sabotaged the negotiations by bogging down the talks on the political accord on procedural details, ensuring that no political accord was signed, which were the precondition for the military accords (not until 3 September 1939 was the political accord finally signed).  Bonnet's reasons in seeking to block the signing of the Franco-Polish political accord were a way of applying pressure on the Poles to grant the Soviets transit rights, and because in case the negotiations for the "grand alliance" failed, Bonnet did not wish to see France any more committed to Poland's defense.

During the ultimately failed talks for an Anglo-Franco-Soviet alliance in the spring and summer of 1939, Bonnet and the rest of the French leadership pressed quite strongly for the revived Triple Entente, often to the considerable discomfort of the British. In the spring and summer of 1939, Bonnet very strongly believed that a "grand alliance" of the Soviet Union, Great Britain and France would deter Germany from attacking Poland. At a meeting with Lord Halifax on 20–21 May 1939 while returning from Geneva, Daladier, Bonnet and Saint-Legér pressured the British Foreign Secretary repeatedly for a "grand alliance" as the only way of stopping another world war.  In the spring of 1939, Bonnet went so far as to inform Moscow that he supported turning over all of eastern Poland to the Soviet Union regardless of what the Poles felt about the issue if that was to be the price of the Soviet alliance. On 2 June 1939, when the Soviet government offered up its definition of what constituted "aggression", upon which the intended alliance was to come into play, Bonnet sided with the Soviets against the British, who felt that the Soviet definition of "aggression", especially "indirect aggression" was too loose a definition and phrased in such a manner as to imply the Soviet right of inference in the internal affairs of nations of Eastern Europe.

On 24 June 1939, Coulondre visited Paris to meet Bonnet. Coulondre complianed that that Bonnet's equivocal statements to Count Johannes von Welczeck about what France would do if Germany invaded Poland had convinced Ribbentrop that France would do nothing. Coulondre advised Bonnet to make an unequivocal statement to Welczeck that France would stand by its alliance with Poland if Germany invaded, advice that Bonnet ignored. In June 1939, a long war of words between Bonnet and Ribbentrop began in the summer of 1939 over just what precisely Bonnet actually said to Ribbentrop as Ribbentrop issued a statement to the French media stated that Bonnet had told him on 6 December 1938 that he recognized Eastern Europe as being the exclusive sphere of influence for the Reich. Adamthwaite wrote that all of the evidence supports Ribbentrop's version of events. Later in June 1939, Bonnet's reputation was badly damaged when the French agent of the Dienststelle Ribbentrop, Otto Abetz, was expelled from France for engaging in espionage, French newspaper editors were charged with receiving bribes from Abetz, and the name of Bonnet's wife was prominently mentioned in connection with the Abetz case as a close friend of the two editors, but despite much lurid speculation in the French press at the time, there was no conclusive evidence linking Bonnet or his wife to German espionage or bribery. As Bonnet continued to ignore Coulondre's advice on making a firm statement to Welczeck, Coulondre appealed directly to Daladier in a phone call. Daladier in turn ordered Bonnet to make such a statement to Welczeck. On 1 July 1939, Bonnet told Count von Welczeck that Germany should not try to unilaterally change the status of Danzig and that France would honor its alliance with Poland.

On 1 July 1939, in response to a message from the Soviet Foreign Commissar Vyacheslav Molotov about what nations the intended "grand alliance" was meant to protect, Bonnet sent a telegraph in reply stating the purpose of the "grand alliance" was "the mutual solidarity of the three great powers...in those conditions the number of countries guaranteed is unimportant". Besides working for the "peace front" with Britain and the Soviet Union, Bonnet tried to enlist Turkey in the "peace front" in July 1939 by arranging for the French and British treasuries to provide financial support to Ankara. By early July 1939, Bonnet grew increasingly irritated over what he regarded as British foot-dragging in the talks with the Soviets and Polish refusing to grant transit rights to the Red Army. Bonnet wrote to Lord Halifax at this time stating "We are reaching a critical moment, where we find it necessary to do everything possible to succeed". As part of his effort to save the talks, Bonnet wrote up and presented, to both London and Moscow, the text of a joint communiqué stating to the world their determination to resist aggression and that they "agreed on the main points of the political agreement". Bonnet's effort was blocked by Molotov, who stated his government had no interest in issuing such a communiqué.

On 18 July 1939, Bonnet had a discussion with Daladier where stated that he felt that Hitler was serious about going to war with Poland, and he believed that the best solution would be for France to pressure Poland into allowing the Free City to "go home to the Reich" as the necessary price of peace. Bonnet also recommended having France pressure Poland into returning the Polish Corridor along with Upper Silesia, neither of which Hitler had asked for yet. Bonnet's preferred solution to the Danzig crisis was an international conference and he stated that had a long conversation with Sir Nevile Henderson, the British ambassador in Berlin, during his visit to Paris. Bonnet presented Henderson's views in a manner that implied that Henderson was speaking for London. Daladier was very much opposed  to Bonnet's recommendations as he stated that St. Léger had inormed him that he was convinced that the Anglo-French-Soviet "peace front" would soon come into existence, which would deter Germany from war. Daladier expressed the view that Hitler was bluffing in his threats and would not chose war if he were confronted with overwhelming force. Bonnet was not as quite sanguine as Daladier was about the "peace front" as he noted the issue of transit rights for the Red Army across Poland still had to be resolved, though he did agree that the "peace front" was the best way of deterring Hitler from war.

In August 1939, Bonnet took up a Turkish effort of mediation between the British and the Soviets as part of an attempt to break the deadlock. On 2 August 1939, Bonnet told Phipps that his main opponents in the cabinet were Daladier along with the  Paul Reynaud, the minister of finance; César Campinchi, the minister of the marine;  Albert Sarraut, the minister of the interior; and Georges Mandel, the minister of colonies. Bonnet further maintained that his enemies within the Quai d'Orsay were St. Léger along his friends Coulondre and Corbin.

When the Anglo-Franco-Soviet talks were on the verge of breaking down in August 1939 over the issue of transit rights for the Red Army in Poland, Bonnet instructed the French Embassy in Moscow to inform the Kremlin falsely that the Poles had granted the desired transit rights as part of a desperate bid to rescue the alliance talks with the Soviets. At the same time, immense French diplomatic pressure was applied in Warsaw for the Poles to agree to the transit rights for the Red Army, but the Polish Foreign Minister, Józef Beck was very firm in refusing to consider such an idea. On 19 August 1939, Beck stated in a message to Paris: "We have not got a military agreement with the USSR. We do not want to have one". The conclusion of the Molotov–Ribbentrop Pact of 23 August 1939 left Bonnet highly dejected as he believed the prospect of Soviet economic support for Germany would undermine the effectiveness of a British naval blockade of Germany (which was widely assumed in France to be a prerequisite of defeating Germany), and hence his return to advocating renouncing the Polish alliance as the best way of avoiding war for France.

After the Molotov-Ribbentrop Non-Aggression Pact, Bonnet urged Daladier that the French should inform the Poles that they should give the Free City of Danzig (modern Gdańsk, Poland) to Germany, and if the Poles refused, the French should use that refusal as an excuse to renounce the alliance with Poland. At a cabinet meeting on 22 August 1939, Bonnet spoke against French mobilization and argued that France should seek to find a way to end the alliance with Poland. Bonnet supported by St. Léger-Léger and Daladier argued for making one more attempt to win the Soviet alliance. Reynaud and Mandel both spoke for French mobilization, which Bonnet argued against as he stated this  would increase Polish "intransigence". Bonnet's comment about French mobilization was "I do not ask for this".

At a meeting of the Standing Committee on National Defense, which comprised the Premier, the Ministers of War, the Navy, the Air and Foreign Affairs and all of the top French military officials on 23 August 1939, Bonnet sought to pressure Marshal Maurice Gamelin into stating that France could not go to war in 1939 as he maintained that France should find a way of renouncing the 1921 alliance with Poland. Bonnet argued that as Poland could be saved with only Soviet support that it was no longer possible for France to risk war because of the German-Soviet Non-Aggression Pact. Bonnet further asserted that oil-rich Romania, helmed in by Germany and the Soviet Union, would now lean towards the totalitarian states and that the Soviets would not allow Turkey (which had been leaning in a pro-Allied direction) to enter the war if Germany attacked a state in the Balkans. At that meeting, Bonnet's arguments for abandoning Poland were countered by Marshal Gamelin, who argued that if war came, there was little France could do for the Poles (whom Gamelin felt could hold out for about three months), but to abandon Poland would be equivalent to abandoning great power status for France. As Bonnet continued his efforts against going to war for Poland, Daladier increasingly came to feel that appointing Bonnet to the Qui d'Orsay had been a mistake and now consumed with hatred for Bonnet. Juliusz Łukasiewicz, the Polish Ambassador to France, accused Bonnet of "preparing a new Munich behind our backs". On 25 August 1939, Daladier told Łukasiewicz that he should avoid speaking to Bonnet under all conditions as he maintained that the views of the Foreign Minister regarding the Danzig crisis were not his own, and advised Łukasiewicz to only speak to himself or St. Léger. On the evening of 27 August 1939, Coulondre wrote a letter to  Daladier declaring: "One must hold firm, Hitler faced with force is a man who will climb down".

On the evening of 31 August 1939, at a meeting of the French cabinet, Bonnet was the leading spokesman for the idea of using the peace mediation proposals of Benito Mussolini as a pretext for ending the alliance with Poland. Before the cabinet meeting of 31 August 1939 opened, Bonnet together his close ally, the Public Works Minister, Anatole de Monzie, sought to pressure some of the more hesitant hawks in the Cabinet such as Charles Pomaret, Henri Queuille and Jean Zay, into endorsing Mussolini's offer. Zay was clearly torn as he stated that he hated the idea of another world war, and stated he was willing to support Mussolini's conference provided it was "not a new Munich". As the cabinet meeting opened, Daladier quite consciously turned his back on Bonnet and refused to speak to him as a way of showing he was against the munichois faction in the cabinet headed by Bonnet. One who was present wrote that Daladier "bristled like a hedgehog. He turned his back on Bonnet from the first minute. His expression was one of contemptuous disgust".  At that cabinet meeting, Bonnet stated that France should accept the Italian offer and reject the British precondition for acceptance, namely the demobilization of the German Army. Daladier had been well briefed by St. Léger beforehand in order to rebut Bonnet. Daladier read out to the cabinet Coulondre's letter which he had received two days before saying: "The trial of strength turns to our advantage. It is only necessary to hold, hold, hold!" St. Léger had kept Coulondre's letter a secret from Bonnet while passing it on to Daladier. Bonnet was taken by surprise by Coulondre's letter and was left fuming in rage as Coulondre's letter won over the cabinet. Daladier, strongly supported by Marshal Gamelin, argued that Mussolini's proposed peace conference was a trick to prevent France from declaring war on Germany, and France should not send a delegation to attend Mussolini's proposed conference. Despite the cabinet meeting, Bonnet ordered François-Poncet to tell Count Ciano that France would attend the conference. Likewise, Bonnet told Phipps that he was going to attend Mussolini's conference, and at 10: 15 am on the morning of 1 September 1939 Lord Halifax received a dispatch stating that France was going to attend the conference to stop a war that already broken out earlier that morning.

 Final days of peace
When Bonnet first learned of the German attack on Poland at 8:20 a.m., on 1 September 1939, his first reaction was to contact the Italian Ambassador to France, Baron Raffaele Guariglia, and informed him that France had accepted Mussolini's mediation offer. Guariglia received a phone call from his French cousin, the Comte de Ronceray who in turn had been briefed by de Monzie. The Comte de Ronceray dismissed the German invasion of Poland as an unfortunate "contretemps", but told Guariglia that Bonnet had lie that Bonnet had won over the cabinet into accepting Mussolini's conference. At 10 am, Guariglia met Bonnet at the Quai d'Orsay who told him that France had accepted the Italian plan for a conference. Present in Bonnet's office were his allies François Piétri; Henri Béranger, the chairman  of the Senate Foreign Affairs committee; Jean Mistler, the chairman of the Chamber of Deputies Foreign Affairs Committee; and the Air Minister Guy la Chambre. Bonnet then ordered François-Poncet to see Mussolini about when the peace conference could begin. Bonnet argued very strongly in the cabinet against a French declaration of war and instead urged that the French take up Mussolini's mediation offer; if the Poles refused to attend Mussolini's conference (which was widely expected since Mussolini's revised peace plan on 1 September called for an armistice, not for the removal of German troops from Poland, the major Polish precondition to accepting the Italian plan), the French should denounce the Polish alliance.

The French cabinet met later that morning to vote to order French mobilization at once and called upon a special session of the National Assembly to vote for a request for 75 milliard francs in war credits. Bonnet continued to argue for attending Mussolini's conference. Later, that same day, Bonnet ordered the Ambassador in London, Charles Corbin, to tell the British that Mussolini's peace offers had been accepted by France.Corbin, in turn, reported that now that war had begun, the British were starting to lose interest in the Italian mediation offer. Likewise, Ambassador Léon Noël, in Warsaw, was instructed to see if the Poles would agree to attending Mussolini's proposed conference, only to receive an angry reply from Beck about when France proposed to honor the Franco-Polish alliance by declaring war on Germany. Strong British pressure for a warning to be delivered in Berlin made Bonnet reluctantly order Ambassador Robert Coulondre late on the afternoon of the 1st to warn Ribbentrop that if the Germans continued with their aggression, then France would declare war on Germany. At midnight on 1 September, Bonnet had Havas issue a statement saying: "The French government has today, as have several other Governments, received an Italian proposal looking to the resolution of Europe's difficulties. After due consideration the French government has given a "positive response"".

On the morning of 2 September, an angry scene occurred at the Quai d'Orsay when the Polish Ambassador Juliusz Łukasiewicz marched in unannounced and during a stormy interview with Bonnet demanded to know why France had not declared war yet. Later that same day, Bonnet during a phone conversation with Count Ciano made a great point of insisting that the French démarche of 1 September was not an ultimatum as he urged that the Italians start the peace conference as soon as possible. Though both Bonnet were serious about the conference, the proposed conference was aborted when Halifax stated that unless the Germans withdrew from Poland immediately, Britain would not attend.

During a phone call to Halifax later on 2 September, Bonnet could not persuade Halifax to drop the precondition about a German withdrawal.  At about 5:00 p.m., Bonnet had another tempestuous interview with Łukasiewicz, who pressed him very strongly for a French declaration of war and accused Bonnet of plotting to betray Poland by keeping France neutral. As part of an effort to gain British acceptance of the Italian plan, Bonnet sought to see if it were possible for the Germans to stage a "symbolic withdrawal" from Poland, only to learn from Lord Halifax that a "symbolic withdrawal" was unacceptable and from Ribbentrop that no withdrawal, symbolic or otherwise was being considered in Berlin. Corbin sought to sabotage Bonnet's policy by advising Chamberlain that he should only speak to Daladier. Bonnet, together with his allies in the "peace lobby" both within and without the government such as Anatole de Monzie, Jean Mistler, Marcel Déat, Paul Faure, Paul Baudoin, Pierre Laval, René Belin, Adrien Marquet, and Gaston Bergery, all spent 1–3 September lobbying the Daladier government, the Senate and the Chamber against going to war with Germany. Bonnet told Daladier the lie that that Count Ciano had persuaded the Germans to accept an armistice as part of the peace plan while in fact Ciano had told Bonnet the precise opposite. There was a moment when Bonnet believed that could use the Italian conference as an excuse for renouncing the alliance with Poland and keeping France out of the war. However, Daladier continued to insist that the Reich had to cease its war against Poland and pull out all of its forces from Poland, and lost interest when he learned the peace plan did not include these demands. The cabinet decided for war on 2 September, but agreed for an extra 24 hours as Marshal Gamelin insisted that France needed more time to mobilize millions of men to the colours without fear of Luftwaffe attacks.  At 10: 30 pm on 2 September 1939, Lord Halifax in a phone call to Bonnet told him that Britain would declare war on Germany tomorrow and he abandoned interest in a planned simultaneous presentations of declarations of war.

On 3 September 1939, Britain declared war on Germany, which had the effect of resolving the debate in Paris and Daladier finally having the French declaration of war issued later that same day. For a week after the war was declared, Daladier avoided having the cabinet meet to ensure that Bonnet would not have a chance to put forward his views about seeking peace with Germany. Bonnet was demoted to minister of justice on 13 September 1939.

Later career
In the latter half of March 1940, Bonnet together with his "peace lobby" allies such as Anatole de Monzie, Pierre-Étienne Flandin, Pierre Laval, Jean Montigny, Jean-Louis Tixier-Vignancour, Georges Scapini, René Dommanage, Gaston Bergery, René Chateau, and René Brunet, made a major lobbying effort to have Laval appointed foreign minister as a prelude to making peace with Germany. Besides chairing meetings of the "peace lobby", which met six times during the Drôle de guerre, Bonnet otherwise remained silent as Justice Minister. On 21 June 1940, Bonnet together with Pierre Laval helped to pressure President Albert Lebrun into changing his mind about leaving for Algeria.

Bonnet supported the Vichy government and served on the National Council from December 1940. As the council never met, his role in Vichy was small. Bonnet spent most of World War II living on his estate in the Dordogne and attempting to secure himself an office in Vichy, though Bonnet was later to claim to have been involved in the Resistance. According to Gestapo records, Bonnet contacted the Germans once in February 1941 to see if it were possible if the Germans would pressure Laval to include him in the Cabinet and again in June 1943 to reassure them that he had no intention of leaving France to join the Allies. In November 1942, Bonnet agreed to testify for the prosecution at the planned trial of Herschel Grynszpan. Bonnet was to testify that his efforts at reaching a rapprochement with the Reich had been sabotaged by the Jews, who were intent on starting a war with Germany, and that Grynszpan had assassinated Ernst von Rath as part of an alleged Jewish conspiracy to push France into war with Germany. However, the trial was never held as Gryszpan's planned defense that he was having a homosexual relationship with Rath, and had shot him as part of a lover's quarrel meant from the German viewpoint the trial was too risky as people might have believed that claim.

On 5 April 1944, Bonnet fled France for Switzerland, claiming his life was in danger. Bonnet stayed in exile until March 1950. After the war, proceedings were begun against him but eventually dropped, but he was expelled from the Radical Party in 1944. During his time in exile, Bonnet was to write a five-volume set of memoirs. Bonnet throughout his career had been very much concerned with his reputation, and during his time as Foreign Minister had a team of journalists to engage in what is known in France as Bonnetiste writing, namely a series of books and pamphlets meant to glorify Bonnet as the defender of the peace and Europe's savior. After leaving the Quai d'Orsay, Bonnet took with him a large number of official papers, which he then used to support the claims made in his voluminous memoirs, where Bonnet depicted himself as waging a singlehanded heroic battle to save the peace.  Many have charged Bonnet with "editing" his papers to present himself in the best possible light, regardless of the facts.  In particular, criticism has centered on some of the contradictory claims in the Bonnet memoirs. At various points, Bonnet claimed it was British pressure that drove France towards Munich in 1938 and that his government wanted to fight for Czechoslovakia. At other times, Bonnet states the military and economic situation in 1938 was such that France could not risk a war in 1939.

In the early 1950s, Bonnet had an intense debate on the pages of the Times Literary Supplement with one of his leading critics, the British historian Sir Lewis Bernstein Namier over some of the claims contained in his memoirs. At issue was whether Bonnet had, as Namier charged, snubbed an offer by the Polish foreign minister Colonel Józef Beck in May 1938 to have Poland come to the aid of Czechoslovakia in the event of a German attack. Bonnet denied that such an offer had been made, which led Namier to accuse Bonnet of seeking to falsify the documentary record.  Namier was able to establish that Bonnet had been less than honest in his account, and concluded the debate in 1953 with the words: "The Polish offer, for what it was worth, was first torpedoed by Bonnet the statesman, and next obliterated by Bonnet the historian". The real significance of the debate was over Bonnet's freedom of maneuver. In his memoirs, Bonnet claimed that he had been often forced by circumstances beyond his control to carry out a foreign policy that he opposed. Namier charged that Bonnet had other options and was carrying out the same foreign policy that he had wanted to carry out.

In 1953, he was allowed to run for office again, and in 1956, Bonnet returned to his old seat in the Dordogne. Readmitted to the Radicals in 1952, he was once again expelled in 1955 for refusing to support Pierre Mendès France. Nevertheless, he was once again elected to the Chamber of Deputies in 1956 and continued to serve in that body until 1968, when he lost his seat.

 Notes 

References
 .

 .
 .
 Haight Jr, John McVickar. "France, the United States, and the Munich crisis." Journal of Modern History 32.4 (1960): 340–358. online
 .

  
 
 .

 
 .

 
 

 Riess, Curt Total Espionage: Germany’s Information and Disinformation Apparatus 1932–1941'', UK: Fonthill, 2016, 
 

.

External links
 

1889 births
1973 deaths
People from Dordogne
Politicians from Nouvelle-Aquitaine
Radical Party (France) politicians
French Ministers of Budget
Transport ministers of France
French Ministers of Commerce and Industry
French Ministers of Posts, Telegraphs, and Telephones
French Ministers of Finance
French Ministers of Pensions
French Foreign Ministers
Members of the 13th Chamber of Deputies of the French Third Republic
Members of the 14th Chamber of Deputies of the French Third Republic
Members of the 15th Chamber of Deputies of the French Third Republic
Members of the 16th Chamber of Deputies of the French Third Republic
Deputies of the 3rd National Assembly of the French Fourth Republic
Deputies of the 1st National Assembly of the French Fifth Republic
Deputies of the 2nd National Assembly of the French Fifth Republic
Deputies of the 3rd National Assembly of the French Fifth Republic
Ambassadors of France to the United States
French military personnel of World War I
University of Paris alumni